The Apostolic Vicariate of the Western District was an ecclesiastical jurisdiction of the Roman Catholic Church in England and Wales. It was led by a vicar apostolic who was a titular bishop. The Apostolic Vicariate of the Western District was created in 1688 and was dissolved in 1850 and replaced by two dioceses.

History

Background 
Soon after the accession of Queen Elizabeth I, the bishops of England were forced to choose between taking the Oath of Supremacy, thus denying the authority of the Pope, or losing their episcopal sees. Those who chose to continue their allegiance to Rome were subsequently deposed and replaced in their sees by priests of the Church of England. Most of the deposed Bishops were imprisoned in various locations and died in captivity over a period of years, though some left the country and continued their work overseas. The last of the deposed bishops was Thomas Goldwell, Bishop of St Asaph, who died in Rome on 3 April 1585.

Restoration: The Vicar Apostolic of England 
In 1623, Pope Urban VIII decided once again to provide a bishop with jurisdiction in England. So it was that Dr William Bishop was appointed, with the title of Vicar Apostolic of England. He died shortly afterwards and was succeeded by Dr Richard Smith, who in August 1631 was forced to resign and fled to France. The office then remained vacant until its revival in 1685 with the appointment of Dr John Leyburn as bishop.

Geographical Organisation 
In 1623 the first Apostolic Vicar, Dr Bishop, divided England into six areas and placed a superior at the head of each with the title of vicar general. This structure remained in place until Dr Leyburn reduced the number from six to four. It was on the basis of these four areas that on 30 January 1688 Pope Innocent XI increased the number of (titular) bishops in England to four. The territory of the former single Apostolic Vicariate was thereby reduced, becoming the Apostolic Vicariate of the London District.  So it was that the Apostolic Vicariate of the Western District was created, along with the Apostolic Vicariate of the Northern District and the Apostolic Vicariate of the Midland District.

Apostolic Vicariate of the Western District 
The Western District consisted of the English historic counties of Cornwall, Devon, Dorset, Gloucestershire, Herefordshire, Somerset and Wiltshire, and all of the Welsh historic counties. The first vicar apostolic of the Western District, with effect from 30 January 1688, was Bishop Philip Michael Ellis OSB, who resigned in 1705. He should have been succeeded by Andrew Giffard (brother of Bonaventure Giffard), however, he refused to accept the appointment. The next vicar apostolic in 1713, after an interregnum, was Matthew Pritchard O.F.M. In 1840, a general redivision of the vicariates took effect. Wales and Herefordshire formed the new Apostolic Vicariate of the Welsh District, and thenceforth the Western District consisted of the English counties in the south west only. Despite this last subdivision and intermittent persecution, an Apostolic Vicariate of the Western District existed until 29 September 1850 when Pope Pius IX issued the Bull Universalis Ecclesiae, by which thirteen new dioceses which did not formally claim any continuity with the pre-Elizabethan English dioceses were created, commonly known as the restoration of the English hierarchy. Among them was the diocese of Clifton, which along with the new Diocese of Plymouth was formed from the territory of the former Apostolic Vicariate of the Western District.

Legacy - Dioceses of Clifton and Plymouth 
Given that the Apostolic Vicars resided chiefly at Bath in Somerset, it was fitting that the last vicar apostolic of the Western District, Dr Joseph William Hendren (1791–1866), consecrated in 1848, should become the first Bishop of Clifton. Thus the new Clifton diocese was in continuity with the old vicariate.

In the early period from 1850 the Clifton diocese was a suffragan of the Metropolitan See of Westminster, but a further development was the creation under Pope Pius X, on 28 October 1911, of a new Province of Birmingham, to which Clifton then was transferred.

The archives of the Western District, one of the most important sources of information for the history of the Church in England from 1780 to 1850 are deposited in the archives of the diocese of Clifton.

The other half of the apostolic vicariate became the Diocese of Plymouth.

List of the Vicars Apostolic of the Western District

See also 

 Catholic Church in England and Wales
 Roman Catholicism in England and Wales
 Lists of patriarchs, archbishops, and bishops
 Catholic Church by country
 Catholic Church hierarchy
 Roman Catholic bishops

References

Bibliography 

 

History of Catholicism in England
Apostolic vicariates
Former Roman Catholic dioceses in Europe
Apostolic vicariates in England and Wales